KFVS TV Mast (also Raycom America Tower Cape Girardeau) is a guyed mast that is 1677 feet (511.1 m) tall, used for transmitting television signals. It was built during 1960 and is located in Cape Girardeau County, Missouri, USA at 37°25′46″N, 89°30′14″W. At the time of its construction it was the world's tallest structure, being exceeded during 1962 by another transmission tower. Broadcasting from the antenna atop the tower, KFVS-TV's signal reaches customers in portions of Missouri, Illinois, Kentucky, Tennessee, and Arkansas.

See also
 List of masts

External links
 https://web.archive.org/web/20020607220946/http://raycommedia.com/global/Story.asp?s=143520 
 
 http://www.skyscraperpage.com/diagrams/?b1452 
 http://www.skyscraperpage.com/diagrams/?b10372

Towers in Missouri
Radio masts and towers in the United States
Towers completed in 1960
1960 establishments in Missouri
Buildings and structures in Cape Girardeau County, Missouri